Muhammad Amir Bijligar  was a companion of Mufti Mahmud and played an active role in national politics, particularly in the 1970s and afterwards. He was sent to jail four times for his political activities during Martial Law regimes.

Overview 

Muhammad Amir received his religious education at the Jamia Islamia Darul Uloomi Sarhad (جامعه اسلاميه دارالعلوم سرحد), a religious school in Peshawar, in 1950. He later joined the institution as a teacher and taught the Quran and Hadith, where a large number of students came to learn from him.

He was Imam of the mosque of Bijli Ghar. This led to him being known as Maulana Bijligar. He had shifted to Peshawar from Darra Adam Khel due to an enmity with some people in the semi tribal belt of Darra. He was popular among the people particularly because of his criticism of the government and its policy makers. Audio cassettes of Bijligar's sermons gained popularity in Peshawar.

Speeches 
Mohammad Amir used to give speeches and sermons in Pashto, Urdu and Hindko language. He spoke on various topics and in his statements he strongly criticized leaders. He was visited by people from far away in order to hear his speeches. He went to jail for speaking out against leaders in three different periods.

Death 
He died on 30 December 2012, after a long illness. He left behind three sons and three daughters.

References 

Jamiat Ulema-e-Islam (F) politicians
Pashtun people
1927 births
2012 deaths
Pakistani Islamic religious leaders
Pakistani Sunni Muslim scholars of Islam